Martha Sofía Tamayo Morales (born 18 September 1951) is a Mexican lawyer and politician affiliated with the Institutional Revolutionary Party. As of 2014 she served as a senator of the LVIII and LIX Legislatures of the Mexican Congress, representing Sinaloa, and as a federal deputy of the LVII  and LXIII Legislatures.

References

1951 births
Living people
Politicians from Sinaloa
People from Mazatlán
Mexican women lawyers
Autonomous University of Sinaloa alumni
Academic staff of Universidad Autónoma de Occidente (Mexico)
Women members of the Senate of the Republic (Mexico)
Members of the Senate of the Republic (Mexico)
Members of the Chamber of Deputies (Mexico)
Institutional Revolutionary Party politicians
20th-century Mexican politicians
20th-century Mexican women politicians
21st-century Mexican politicians
21st-century Mexican women politicians
Women members of the Chamber of Deputies (Mexico)
20th-century Mexican lawyers